Kaida (written: 海田 or 甲斐田) is a Japanese surname. Notable people with the surname include:

, Japanese video game composer
, Japanese voice actress
, Japanese voice actress

Japanese-language surnames